

Competition schedule

Competitions followed this timetable:

Medal winners

Men's

Women's

Medal table

References

2009 Mediterranean Games
Sports at the 2009 Mediterranean Games
Mediterranean Games artistic gymnastics
International gymnastics competitions hosted by Italy